Team Halfords Bikehut was a 2008 UCI elite women's cycling team based in the United Kingdom. The team was formed in January 2008 with Dave Brailsford, performance director of British Cycling, the general manager. It had been a pro/national team mooted as the first full British professional women's team but there were two men in the team (Rob Hayles and Tom Southam). The team was in 2009 not an UCI Women's Teams anymore and consisted of a mix of mountain bikers and road racers (mainly men): Rob Hayles, Ed Clancy, Ian Wilkinson, Andy Tennant, Mark McNally, Rob Partridge, Seb Batchelor, David Fletcher, Annie Last, Sharon Laws, Ian Bibby. The team disbanded ahead of the 2010 season, with a number of riders moving to the Scottish-based Endura Racing team.

The team helped train some of the UK's medal-winning cyclists such as Nicole Cooke, who said: "Setting up Team Halfords was crucial to my success,".

Team roster

Ages as of 1 January 2008. 
 

Male riders: Tom Southam, Rob Hayles

Season victories

Results in major races

UCI World Ranking

The team finished 10th in the UCI ranking for teams.

References 

Cycling teams based in the United Kingdom
Defunct cycling teams based in the United Kingdom
Cycling teams established in 2008
Cycling teams disestablished in 2009
UCI Women's Teams
Cycling teams disestablished in 2008